Marcinków  is a village in the administrative district of Gmina Siewierz, within Będzin County, Silesian Voivodeship, in southern Poland.

The village has a population of 134.

References

Villages in Będzin County